easyFoodstore is a discount supermarket in London, England. The store has no item brands, and only has about 100 items such as tinned goods, pasta, rice, and cleaning products.

History
First announced by easyGroup in 2013, the easyFoodstore supermarket opened in London in February 2016, located next to easyBus House (the headquarters of easyBus Ltd). The supermarket charged just 25p for essential food items. Just days after opening its doors it was forced to shut temporarily after running out of stock. The store now sells items at 50p each, with 25p returning during promotional periods only.

References

External links

See also
List of supermarket chains in the United Kingdom

EasyGroup
Supermarkets of the United Kingdom
Discount shops of the United Kingdom
Retail companies of the United Kingdom
Food and drink companies of England
Companies based in London
Privately held companies of England
English brands
Food and drink companies established in 2016
Retail companies established in 2016
2016 establishments in England